Victor Jones may refer to:

 Victor Jones (cricketer) (1881-1923), Australian cricketer
 Victor Jones (linebacker) (born 1966), American football player
 Victor Jones (running back) (born 1967), American football player
 Victor Jones (British Army officer), British Army officer

See also
 Kenneth Victor Jones (born 1924), British film score composer
 Reginald Victor Jones (1911–1997), British physicist
 Thomas Victor Jones (1920–2014), American businessman